Monroe County Schools may refer to:
Monroe County Intermediate School District (Michigan)
Monroe County Schools (Tennessee)
Monroe County Schools (West Virginia)

See also
Monroe County School District (disambiguation)
Monroe School (disambiguation)